Fabio Albergati (1538–1606) was an Italian diplomat and writer, known for political theory and as a moralist. He was born in Bologna, and was in the service of Jacopo Boncompagni.

Life
Fabio Albergati was born in Bologna in 1538 of an ancient and noble family.

He was one of the most celebrated literati of his time in Italy.
In 1591, Pope Innocent IX appointed him governor of Perugia; and Orlandi asserts that he was also consistorial advocate. This latter statement is not, however, supported by any collateral evidence.

He was held in great esteem by Pope Sixtus V, and in 1589 was sent as papal Ambassador to the court of Francesco Maria della Rovere, the last Duke of Urbino, by whom he was greatly beloved: the duke and he had been fellow students in their youth. In a letter of 1596 Albergati told the duke that he had asked Cardinal Francisco Toledo for permission to read Jean Bodin (whose works were on the Index of forbidden books). The prelate granted it but urged Albergati to confute Bodin's errors. Therefore, he wrote his unpublished Antibodino, submitted it to Cardinal Pietro Aldobrandini after Toledo's death (1596), and sent a copy to the duke, who esteemed Bodin much. After substantially enlarging his original manuscript Albergati eventually decided to publish it, first in Rome (1602) and then in Venice (1603), under the title: Dei discorsi politici libri cinque. Nei quali viene riprovata la dottrina di Gio. Bodino, e difesa quella di Aristotele.

A bronze medal was struck in honour of him, bearing on the obverse his effigy, with the words “Fabius Albergati Mon. Canini Marchio;” and on the reverse, falling dew, with the legend “Divisa beatum.”

Fabio Albergati died in Bologna on 15 August 1606.

Works 

Fabio Albergati is best known as an opponent of the French political philosopher Jean Bodin.

Albergati's Dei Discorsi Politici (1602; 1603) is a detailed analysis of Bodin's République (1576). Albergati considers the political community to be natural, and states his preference for monarchy as the ‘best’ of the constitutions described by Aristotle in his Politics, because of its similarity to divine government.

Albergati takes an anti-Machiavellian line in the work, arguing specifically against his idea that religion could be used as a prop to political power. He elaborated the idea of a kinship, a participation in a similar 'unorthodoxy', between Jean Bodin and Niccolò Machiavelli and equated the philosophy of raison d'état with Machiavellianism.

In his work La republica regia (1627), a counter to Machiavelli's Prince, Albergati prefers to reconfirm that, against reason and interest of state, the natural and moral reasons on which political government is based are still valid: 

Consequently, if one wants to talk of reason of state as an instrument of government utilized by all sovereigns, it must be strictly combined with that civil prudence which guarantees a solid link - already definitively argued by the doctrine of Aristotle - of honesty to usefulness, of virtue to civil commitment. Certainly, the reference to the Catholic faith is explicit, nevertheless - sustains Albergati - it is natural reason which must guide the work of the governors and the governed; this is the main aim of his work: «the reasons of the modern politician, turned down not on the grounds of faith, but on the grounds of natural reason» (La republica regia, p. 338). Furthermore, in the writing of Albergati, the difficulty of defining the point of equilibrium in the tension between morals and politics, can be found in those passages in which the author confirms the possibility of the prince's carrying out certain dissimilatory practices (La republica regia, pp. 199 and 261).

The following is a list of his works:

 Del Modo di ridurre alla Pace le Inimicizie private. Roma, 1583, fol. This essay on duelling was published in Rome with a dedication to the nephew of the pope, Giacomo Boncompagni, then involved at first hand in the campaign against banditry. Albergati's Trattato went into numerous editions in the course of the Seicento.
 Del Cardinale, Libri III. Bologna. 1589. The treatise is dedicated to the newly elected cardinal, Prince Odoardo Farnese. Albergati's Del Cardinale was to celebrate the excellence of those who combined in their person the prince and the cardinal, uniting virtues of government with elevated spiritual qualities.
 
 Le Morali, edited by his son Antonio, Bishop of Bisceglie. Bologna, 1627, fol.
 
 Ragionamento al Cardinale S. Sisto come nipote di Papa Gregorio. Milano. 1600.
He left several other works in manuscript, which were preserved in the library of the Duke of Urbino. In 1573 Zanetti published, at Rome, six vols. of Albergati's moral works.

Family
By his wife, the Countess Flaminia, daughter of the Count Antonio Bentivoglio, he had six sons and five daughters. One of his daughters, Lavinia, became the wife of the Duke Orazio Ludovisi, the brother of Gregory XV.

His children included Cardinal Niccolò Albergati-Ludovisi.

References

Notes

External links
 
WorldCat page
 
 

1538 births
1606 deaths
Italian male writers
Writers from Bologna
16th-century Italian writers
17th-century Italian writers
Diplomats from Bologna
Italian political philosophers